Václav Šafránek (born 20 May 1994) is an inactive Czech tennis player.

Šafránek has a career-high ATP singles ranking of 191 achieved on 6 November 2017. He also has a career-high doubles ranking of 286 achieved on 18 September 2017.

Šafránek has won one ATP Challenger doubles title at the 2017 Båstad Challenger.

Tour titles

Doubles

References

External links
 
 

1994 births
Living people
Czech male tennis players
Sportspeople from Brno